Nightmare (Swedish: Nattmara) is a 1965 Swedish thriller film directed by Arne Mattsson and starring Ulla Jacobsson, Gunnar Hellström and Sven Lindberg. It was shot at the Råsunda Studios in Stockholm. The film's sets were designed by the art director P.A. Lundgren.

Cast
 Ulla Jacobsson as 	Maj Berg
 Gunnar Hellström as 	Per Berg
 Sven Lindberg as 	Police Capt. Peter Storm
 Mimi Pollak as 	Anna Söderblom
 Mona Malm as 	Pia Bolt
 Tord Peterson as 	Max Eriksson-Berg
 Ingrid Backlin as 	Elsa Johansson 
 Christina Carlwind as Eva Jansson 
 Rune Halvarsson as Erik Boman 
 Marianne Karlbeck as Berta Larsson 
 Birger Lensander as 	Messenger

References

Bibliography 
 Qvist, Per Olov & von Bagh, Peter. Guide to the Cinema of Sweden and Finland. Greenwood Publishing Group, 2000.

External links 
 

1965 films
Swedish thriller films
1960s thriller films
1960s Swedish-language films
Films directed by Arne Mattsson
1960s Swedish films